Kongens Lyngby (Danish for "the King's Heather Town"; short form Lyngby) is the seat and commercial centre of Lyngby-Taarbæk Municipality in the northern suburbs of Copenhagen, Denmark. Lyngby Hovedgade is a busy shopping street and the site of a branch of Magasin du Nord as well as Lyngby Storcenter. The district is also home to several major companies, including COWI A/S, Bang & Olufsen, ICEpower a/s and Microsoft. The Technical University of Denmark relocated to Lyngby from central Copenhagen in the 1970s. Lyngby station is located on the Hillerød radial of Copenhagen's S-train network.

History

The name Kongens Lyngby is first recorded in 1348. At that time large parts of North Zealand belonged to the Catholic Church (represented by Roskilde Cathedral and the name Lyngby was associated with several places. Store Lyngby belonged to Arresø church. "Our" Lyngby, on the other hand, was crown land. It may therefore have been to distinguish it from these other places that the name emerged.

The original Lyngby village is now known as Bondebyen. Kongens Lyngby was also the site of a watermill, Lyngby Watermill, which is first mentioned in 1492 but is probably several hundred years older.

A royal road, Lyngby Kongevej, was created in 1584 to provide an easy link between Copenhagen and Frederick's new Frederiksborg Castle from where it was later extended to Fredensborg and Helsingør. It was the first of a number of royal roads created by Frederick II and his successor Christian IV.

In the 18th century, a growing number of country houses were built in the area by civil servants and merchants from Copenhagen. Kongens Lyngby had no market rights but developed into a local service centre with an increasing number of craftsmen and merchants.

The North Line came to  Lyngby in 1863 and was extended to Helsingør in 1864. This enabled citizens from Copenhagen to settle permanently in the area. Several factories opened in the area, including Christian Hasselbalck's curtain factory in 1892 which later became the town's largest employer.

In the 1930s, Kongens Lyngby developed into a modern suburb. The North Line was converted into an S-train line with more stations and Kongens Lyngby gradually merged with the neighboring settlements.

Notable residents

Public persons
Vilhelm Theodor Walther (1819–1892), architect and building inspector
Ingrid Jespersen (1867–1938), pedagogue and school principal
Finn Thiesen (born 1941), linguist, iranist, and translator
Carsten Koch (born 1945), former MF and minister
Lise-Lotte Rebel (born 1951), bishop and first woman bishop in the Church of Denmark
Mads Tofte (born 1959), computer scientist
Daniel Toft Jakobsen (born 1978), MF

Arts
Elisa Marie Thornam (1857–1901), landscape painter and botanical illustrator
Olga Wagner (1873–1963), painter and sculptor
Dagmar Freuchen-Gale (1907–1991), illustrator, author and editor
Kasper Heiberg (1928–1984), painter and sculptor
Nina Pens Rode (1929–1992), actress
Hans Abrahamsen (born 1952), composer
Lars von Trier (born 1956), film director and screenwriter
Søs Fenger (born 1961), musician

Sports
Sofus Rose (1894–1974), long-distance runner
Margot Bærentzen (1907–1983), fencer
Erling Stuer Lauridsen (1916–2012), wrestler
Johan Runge (1924–2005), weightlifter
Helge Hansen (1925–2008), cyclist
Ib Larsen (born 1945), rower
Henrik Larsen (born 1966), footballer and football manager
Frederik Nielsen (born 1983), tennis player
Nabil Aslam (born 1984), footballer
Jeanette Ottesen (born 1987), swimmer
Mai Grage (born 1992), tennis player
Jacob Bruun Larsen (born 1998), footballer
Christian Rasmussen (born 2003), footballer

References

External links

 Source
 Lygby Hovedgade

Municipal seats in the Capital Region of Denmark
Municipal seats of Denmark
Copenhagen metropolitan area
Neighbourhoods in Denmark
Cities and towns in the Capital Region of Denmark
Lyngby-Taarbæk Municipality